LifeSiteNews (or simply LifeSite) is a Canadian Catholic conservative anti-abortion advocacy website and news publication. LifeSiteNews has published misleading information and conspiracy theories, and in 2021, was banned from some social media platforms for spreading COVID-19 misinformation.

History 
LifeSiteNews was founded in 1997 by the Canadian political lobbyist organization Campaign Life Coalition with the intent to promote anti-abortion views. At a 2013 March for Life Youth Conference in Ottawa, founder and editor-in-chief John-Henry Westen alleged there was a media conspiracy against the anti-abortion movement, and said that the purpose of LifeSiteNews was to circumvent the mainstream media. 

A Catholic priest and former member of the Canadian Parliament, Raymond Gravel, filed a defamation lawsuit in Quebec against the website in 2011. He claimed that the site's description of his self-described pro-choice views as "pro-abortion" was libelous, and sought  in damages. LifeSiteNews had published 41 articles about Gravel as of February 2013. In 2013, the lawsuit was allowed to advance to trial by a Quebec court. Gravel died of lung cancer on August 11, 2014. 

LifeSiteNews claimed in 2018 to have a readership of 20million. Its editor-in-chief is John-Henry Westen, and the president is Steve Jalsevac. The Campaign Life Coalition no longer runs LifeSiteNews, though the two groups share some board members.

Content and views 
LifeSiteNews was founded for the purpose of opposing legal abortion, and that remains a primary focus. It also regularly publishes articles expressing opposition to contraception, homosexuality, and transgender rights, and its website names euthanasia and cloning among other issues it opposes. A Catholic publication, many of its articles are faith-related. It has published many articles critical of Pope Francis, and regularly publishes writing by critics of Francis including Italian archbishop, former Vatican diplomat, and conspiracy theorist Carlo Maria Viganò and Cardinal Raymond Burke. 

LifeSiteNews has been described as far-right, conservative, social conservative, and ultraconservative.

Fact-checking website Snopes described LifeSiteNews in 2016 as "a known purveyor of misleading information". Paul Moses wrote for Commonweal in 2021 that LifeSiteNews coverage "feigns journalistic accuracy, but misleads through omission". The Canadian Anti-Hate Network described the website in a 2021 report as a "Christian version of Breitbart".

Political Research Associates analyst Heron Greenesmith categorized LifeSiteNews to NBC News in September 2019 as a member of the "Christian-right anti-transgender disinformation ecosystem" and stated, "LifeSite platforms the small number of anti-trans researchers, academics, and right-wing professional associations, giving their work a veneer of scientific validity". Brennan Suen of the watchdog group Media Matters for America said that LifeSite "typically refuses to acknowledge transgender identities and serially misgenders trans folk in its coverage", and that it "refers to the abhorrent practice of conversion therapy as treating 'unwanted homosexual attraction.'" Moses wrote in Commonweal that the site spread confusion about COVID-19, and that their coverage "is so slanted that anyone relying on it would be terribly misled on what the science shows". 

LifeSiteNews regularly publishes conspiracy theories. The site has published misleading claims about Donald Trump's attempts to overturn the results of the 2020 presidential election and articles supportive of the "Stop the Steal" campaign with the same goal. Some articles on the website use the tag "New World Order", the name of a conspiracy theory which hypothesizes a secretly emerging totalitarian world government.

LifeSiteNews has published misinformation about COVID-19 vaccines. In November 2022, LifeSiteNews promoted the anti-vaccine film Died Suddenly.

Social media bans 
LifeSiteNews' Twitter accounts have been temporarily suspended at least four times since 2018; once in error, twice for violating rules against "targeted misgendering or deadnaming of transgender individuals", and once for violating rules against spreading COVID-19 misinformation.

LifeSiteNews' YouTube channel was banned in February 2021 for persistently promoting COVID-19 misinformation. One video claimed that COVID-19 was "the greatest hoax ever perpetrated on an unsuspecting public". Another promoted anti-vaccine sentiment, cast doubt on the efficacy of COVID-19 vaccines, and stated that COVID-19 "isn't really killing people right and left that weren't probably gonna die within the year anyway". These claims contradicted the scientific consensus and reports from authorities like the World Health Organization, and violated YouTube policies on promotion of health misinformation.

LifeSiteNews was permanently banned from Facebook in May 2021 for violations of policies prohibiting COVID-19 misinformation. According to LifeSiteNews, Facebook said the ban was related to their policy of removing anti-vaccination accounts, and a Facebook spokesperson allegedly accused LifeSiteNews of disseminating "false information about COVID-19 that could contribute to physical harm". A joint statement signed by Media Matters for America, GLAAD, the Human Rights Campaign, and NARAL Pro-Choice America said they had collected and reported to Facebook over 100 posts by LifeSiteNews that allegedly spread COVID-19 and vaccine-related misinformation. They added that they believed Facebook should have banned the group "years ago" for using the platform to "push its noxious anti-LGBTQ and anti-choice extremism".

See also
 Church Militant (website)

References

External links

1997 establishments in Canada
501(c)(3) organizations
Abortion in media
Advocacy groups in Canada
Anti-abortion organizations in Canada
Canadian news websites
Catholic newspapers
Conservative magazines published in Canada
Conspiracist media
COVID-19 misinformation
Fake news websites
Far-right politics in Canada
Mass media in Toronto
Organizations that oppose LGBT rights
Websites with far-right material
COVID-19 vaccine misinformation and hesitancy